Fred Acorn (born March 17, 1961) is a former American football defensive back. He played for the Tampa Bay Buccaneers in 1984.

References

1961 births
Living people
American football defensive backs
Texas Longhorns football players
Tampa Bay Buccaneers players